Tren del Valle is a  commuter rail service that connects cities of Plottier, Neuquén and Cipolletti, in the Río Negro and Neuquén Provinces of Argentina, running on Roca Railway tracks. In a second stage, the line would be extended to General Roca and Plottier, in the same province.

The Tren del Valle is named after "Alto valle del Río Negro", a valley located at the north west of Río Negro Province, crossing cities of General Roca, Cipolletti, Villa Regina, Cinco Saltos, among others. It extends from the confluence of Limay and Neuquén rivers to Chichinales.

The service, after preliminary tests, was opened on 21 July 2015, being operated by state-owned Trenes Argentinos.

History 

After the railways were nationalised in 1948, the BAGSR became part of General Roca Railway, one of the six divisions of recently created state-owned Ferrocarriles Argentinos.

In 2014, several railway projects were approved for the Río Negro and Neuquén provinces to reactivate passenger services in the region, they were Estrella del Valle, Tren del Valle, and Tren del Dique, running on Roca Railway tracks. The first step of the project will be to open the "Tren del Valle" that will connect cities of Neuquén (of the homonymous province) and Cipolletti in Río Negro Province. Rolling stock used will be provided by local company Materfer, that was committed to build 20 CMM 400-2 railcars to run on the line. There is no time limit for the reopening.

Works for the reopening included repair of the bridge that crosses the river and the remodelling of Neuquén station, apart of the installation of six warning devices on six level crossings along the route.

During the first days of July 2015, the train made its first preliminary tests, running between both cities before being officially inaugurated on 20 of July. The first expansion was made in 2021 to the city of Plottier, around 15 km west of Neuquén.

Other projects plan to extend the service to the end of the valley, reaching cities such as Senillosa and Chichinales.

Gallery

See also 
 Neuquén-Cipolletti bridges

References

External links 

 

v
Transport in Río Negro Province